is a Japanese video game composer known for his work on Nintendo games, most notably in The Legend of Zelda and Splatoon series. He also voices Petey Piranha in the Mario series. He was raised in a musical family and developed an interest in video games and their music from an early age. Minegishi did not receive any special education, but he gained experience as a musician during his school and college years.

Biography

Early life
Minegishi grew up in a musical family; his parents were especially fond of Latin and tango music. He became interested in video games at the age of ten after he saw a commercial for The Legend of Zelda. As he kept his promise of improving his performance in swimming school, his parents gave him a Family Computer Disk System with The Legend of Zelda as a gift. One year later, he listened to Modest Mussorgsky's Pictures at an Exhibition for the first time, which is a suite of ten movements based on paintings by Viktor Hartmann. The suite's composition technique, which focused on matching music to visuals, had a big influence on Minegishi, and furthered his interest in video game music. Unlike other composers and professional musicians, he received no special musical education, and took no piano lessons when he was young; instead, Minegishi became interested in music by himself. He was percussionist of a school band in junior high, and later played drums in a band he had formed with his friends at college.

Career
Minegishi kept pursuing his dream of becoming a video game sound designer and applied at Nintendo. After he had passed a composition examination and a written music test, he obtained a job at the sound group of the Entertainment Analysis and Development (EAD) division. Minegishi often listens to music at home to make himself familiar with a variety of musical styles. He prefers to create melodies in his head, but composes on the keyboard and the guitar as well. The startup sound for the GameCube game console is one of the musical pieces he had conceived without instruments. Minegishi cites the development of sound effects for Super Mario Sunshine and the creation of over 50 compositions from different musical genres for Animal Crossing (K.K. Slider's songs) as some of his greatest learning experiences. He considers video game composer Koji Kondo, the manager of the EAD sound group, as big inspiration and a master of video game sound. Minegishi's first involvement in the Legend of Zelda series was with the composition of three battle themes for Majora's Mask. Later, he was assigned as the main composer for Twilight Princess. Several of his compositions for Twilight Princess were arranged for orchestra by Jonne Valtonen, and performed at the concert Symphonic Legends in September 2010. In addition to musical work, he has served as the voice actor of Petey Piranha in various appearances.

Works

References

Iwata Asks: Wii Fit

External links

Japanese composers
Japanese male composers
Living people
Nintendo people
Video game composers
Japanese drummers
21st-century drummers
21st-century Japanese male musicians
1975 births
People from Shibukawa, Gunma
Musicians from Gunma Prefecture